The 1906 Holy Cross football team was an American football team that represented the College of the Holy Cross in the 1906 college football season.

In their only year under head coach George W. King, the Crusaders compiled a 4–3–1 record. George S.L. Connor returned for a second year as the team captain.

Holy Cross played its home games at the Fitton Field baseball stadium on the college campus in Worcester, Massachusetts.

Schedule

References

Holy Cross
Holy Cross Crusaders football seasons
Holy Cross football